"Anna's Song" is a song recorded by singer Marvin Gaye as part of his 1978 album, Here, My Dear. Recorded during the midst of Marvin and estranged wife Anna going through an acrimonious divorce, the song autobiographically depicted several parts of Marvin and Anna's past including one lyric that hints at his first hit single, "Stubborn Kind of Fellow" where Gaye says "What's it, husband, makes you so stubborn?". A memorable part of the song for Marvin's fans includes a verse where Marvin's vocals rise when singing Anna's name. Unlike most of the songs on the album with the exception of "Sparrow", this song was recorded in a jazzy atmosphere.

Personnel
All vocals, keyboards and synthesizers by Marvin Gaye
Guitars by Wali Ali and Gordon Banks
Bass by Frank Blair

Marvin Gaye songs
1978 songs
Songs written by Marvin Gaye
Song recordings produced by Marvin Gaye